Horacio Salaberry (born 3 April 1987) is a Uruguayan footballer. He currently plays for River Plate in the Uruguayan Primera División.

Honours
LDU Quito
Ecuadorian Serie A: 2018

External links

 
 Profile at Ecuagol

1987 births
Living people
People from Colonia del Sacramento
Uruguayan footballers
Association football defenders
Ecuadorian Serie A players
Categoría Primera A players
Defensor Sporting players
Club Atlético River Plate (Montevideo) players
C.A. Rentistas players
Plaza Colonia players
Mushuc Runa S.C. footballers
L.D.U. Portoviejo footballers
S.D. Aucas footballers
Independiente Santa Fe footballers
L.D.U. Quito footballers
Uruguayan expatriate footballers
Uruguayan expatriate sportspeople in Ecuador
Expatriate footballers in Ecuador
Expatriate footballers in Colombia